Nansemond County Training School, also known as Southwestern High School, is a historic Rosenwald School for African-American students located at Suffolk, Virginia. It was built in 1924, and is a one-story building consisting of a central block with a recessed covered porch and flanking wings.  It is capped with a tin hipped roof.  Also on the property is  the contributing cafeteria building that was later used as an extra classroom.  It was built to house the first public black high school in Nansemond County, Virginia, and included both the primary and secondary grades.  The school closed following the 1969–70 school year.

It was added to the National Register of Historic Places in 2004.

References

African-American history of Virginia
Rosenwald schools in Virginia
School buildings on the National Register of Historic Places in Virginia
School buildings completed in 1924
Schools in Suffolk, Virginia
National Register of Historic Places in Suffolk, Virginia
1924 establishments in Virginia